Manuel 'Manu' Micó Yébana (born 18 July 1986 in Valencia) is a Spanish retired footballer who played as a left back.

External links

1986 births
Living people
Spanish footballers
Footballers from Valencia (city)
Association football defenders
Segunda División B players
Tercera División players
Novelda CF players
Valencia CF Mestalla footballers
Orihuela CF players
Recreativo de Huelva players
Ontinyent CF players
Atlético Saguntino players
Écija Balompié players
UD Alzira footballers
Belgian Pro League players
Royal Excel Mouscron players
Spanish expatriate footballers
Expatriate footballers in Belgium
Spanish expatriate sportspeople in Belgium